Arkadiusz Bogusław Bazak (born 12 January 1939) is a Polish actor. He has appeared in more than 40 films and television shows since 1964.

Selected filmography
 Westerplatte (1967)
 Znaki na drodze (1970)
 The Deluge (1974)
 Przylbice i kaptury (1985)

References

External links

1939 births
Living people
Polish male film actors
Male actors from Warsaw
People from Warsaw Voivodeship (1919–1939)
Polish male stage actors
Polish male voice actors